George Henry Moger  (September 1878 – 16 June 1927) was an English football goalkeeper.

Playing career
Born in Southampton, Moger started his career with local side Forest Swifts, before joining Southampton St. Marys' main local rivals, Freemantle in 1898. In 1899 he was suspended for two months due to his having played amateur football for Forest Swifts whilst registered as a professional with Freemantle.

Southampton
He joined Southampton in the summer of 1900, but spent most of his time at Southampton as understudy to the England international 'keeper, Jack Robinson. Tall and lean, Moger was particularly useful in high-ball situations when he could come off his goal line to punch the ball clear. Robinson's dominance of the 'keeper's position restricted Moger to 14 Southern League appearances in his three years at The Dell.

Manchester United
In May 1903, he was sold to Manchester United who had spotted his potential when at Southampton. He would stay with United until 1912 when he retired. During his Manchester United career, he made 266 appearances, and helped United to the Football League titles in 1907–08 and 1910–11, and the FA Cup in 1909.

Life after football 
Moger retired as a player in 1912 and then began a new career as an accountant and commission agent. He died at the age of 48 in a Belgrave Road nursing home in Middlesex on 16 June 1927. He was buried in Manchester four days later, on 20 June 1927.

First World War
Moger served as a gunner in the Royal Garrison Artillery during the First World War.

Honours
Manchester United
Football League First Division: 1907–08, 1910–11
FA Cup: 1908–09

References

External links

Football and the First World War profile
Manchester United profile
Manchester United career details

1878 births
1927 deaths
Footballers from Southampton
English footballers
Manchester United F.C. players
Freemantle F.C. players
Southampton F.C. players
Southern Football League players
Association football goalkeepers
FA Cup Final players